David Nicholls (born 3 November 1956) is an English former professional footballer who played as a midfielder.

Career
Born in Bradford, Newton began his career with Huddersfield Town. He joined Bradford City in August 1975. He made 4 league appearances for the club. Heleft the club in August 1976 to sign for Gainsborough Trinity.

He also played for England Schools.

Sources

References

1956 births
Living people
English footballers
Huddersfield Town A.F.C. players
Bradford City A.F.C. players
Gainsborough Trinity F.C. players
English Football League players
Association football midfielders